Coprostane, also known as 5β-cholestane, is a steroid and a parent compound of a variety of steroid derivatives, such as ecdysone and coprostanol.

References

Cholestanes